Ples may refer to the following places:

 Ples, Bistrica ob Sotli, Slovenia
 Ples, Moravče, Slovenia
 Mrs. Ples, the popular nickname for a complete Australopithecus africanus skull

See also
 
 Pleš (disambiguation)
 Pleß (disambiguation)
 Plyos, Ivanovo Oblast (Russian: Плёс), a town in Privolzhsky District of Ivanovo Oblast